The Green Barn was a historic barn on McClure Avenue in Lowell, Arkansas.  It was a square structure with a pyramidal roof topped by a square louvered cupola, that had shed-roof leantos on three sides.  The building was earthfast, with posts set in the ground.  Built c. 1910, it had an unusual shape differing significantly from typical barns of the area.

The barn was listed on the National Register of Historic Places in 1988, at which time it was reported to be significantly deteriorated; and has since been destroyed.

See also
National Register of Historic Places listings in Benton County, Arkansas

References

Barns on the National Register of Historic Places in Arkansas
Buildings and structures completed in 1910
National Register of Historic Places in Benton County, Arkansas
1910 establishments in Arkansas
Demolished buildings and structures in Arkansas